The Nathan Westcott House is a historic house in Cranston, Rhode Island.  This -story gambrel-roofed wood-frame house was built c. 1770 as a "half house", and extended about 20 years later, based on architectural evidence.  The house was probably built by Nathan Westcott, a member of the locally prominent Westcott family, whose progenitor was among the area's early settlers.  The house was later owned by the Joy family, whose homestead stands next door.

The house was listed on the National Register of Historic Places in 1989.

See also
National Register of Historic Places listings in Providence County, Rhode Island

References

Houses completed in 1770
Houses on the National Register of Historic Places in Rhode Island
Houses in Cranston, Rhode Island
National Register of Historic Places in Providence County, Rhode Island
1770 establishments in Rhode Island